Wurmsham is a municipality in the district of Landshut in Bavaria in Germany.

References

Landshut (district)